The 65th Air Base Group is a group of the United States Air Force based at Lajes Field, Azores, Portugal.

The group provides base and en route support for the U.S. Department of Defense, allied nations and other authorized aircraft in transit, including those from the Netherlands, Belgium, Canada, France, Italy, Colombia, Germany, Venezuela and Great Britain.

Components
 65th Civil Engineer Squadron
 65th Communications Squadron
 65th Logistics Readiness Squadron
 65th Operations Support Squadron
 65th Security Forces Squadron
 65th Comptroller Flight
 65th Force Support Flight
 496th Air Base Squadron

History
The 65th was first organized at Mitchel Air Force Base, New York as the 65th Troop Carrier Wing in 1952.  It conducted "reserve training toward proficiency with troop carrier aircraft from 1952–1953. However, the wing was never fully manned or equipped."

The 1605th Military Airlift Support Wing replaced the 1605th Air Base Wing as the Military Airlift Command unit managing facilities at Lajes Field in January 1982.  Ten years later, the two units were consolidated as the 65th Support Wing.

It has "provided en route support for aircraft transiting Lajes Air Base from 1982 to the present."  Its commander also serves as Commander, United States Forces Azores.  The unit also "provided base support to elements of the United States Army and U.S. Navy in the area." The 65th "supported deployment of personnel and equipment through Lajes during operations in the Persian Gulf from August 1990 – April 1991" and in support of the War in Afghanistan (2001-2021) (Operation Enduring Freedom) and the War in Iraq (Operation Iraqi Freedom) since 2001 and 2003 respectively.

On 14 August 2015, the wing was redesignated as a group and reassigned to the 86th Airlift Wing.

On 21 August 2015, Airman 1st Class Spencer Stone, a medical technician of the 65th Medical Operations Squadron was one of 6 passengers, including three Americans who thwarted the attack on a high speed train travelling from Brussels to Paris by an armed gunman by tackling and subduing him, then helping to provide medical aid to a wounded passenger. On 16 September 2015, he received the Airman's Medal and a Purple Heart medal from U.S. Secretary of Defense Ashton Carter at the Pentagon.

Lineage
65th Strategic Reconnaissance Wing
 Established as the 65th Troop Carrier Wing, Medium on 26 May 1952
 Activated in the Reserve on 14 June 1952
 Inactivated on 1 April 1953
 Redesignated 65th Strategic Reconnaissance Wing, Medium on 1 April 1953
 Consolidated with the 1605th Military Airlift Support Wing as the 1605th Military Airlift Support Wing on 1 January 1992

65th Air Base Group
 Established as the 1605th Military Airlift Support Wing and activated on 1 January 1982
 Consolidated with the 65th Strategic Reconnaissance Wing on 1 January 1992
 Redesignated 65th Support Wing on 27 January 1992
 Redesignated 65th Air Base Wing on 1 October 1993
 Redesignated 65th Air Base Group 11 August 2015

Assignments
 First Air Force, 14 June 1952 – 1 April 1953
 Twenty-First Air Force 1 January 1982
 Eighth Air Force, 1 October 1993
 Third Air Force, 1 October 2002
 United States Air Forces Europe, 1 November 2005
 Air Command Europe, 18 November 2005
 Third Air Force (Air Forces Europe), 1 December 2006
 86th Airlift Wing, 11 August 2015

Components
 Groups
 65th Troop Carrier Group, 14 June 1952 – 1 April 1953
 65th Air Base Group (later 1605th Air Base Group, 65th Support Group, 65th Mission Support Group), 14 June 1952 – 1 April 1953, 1 January 1982 – 14 August 2015
 65th Logistics Group, 27 January 1992 – c. 1997
 65th Medical Group (later USAF Hospital, Lajes, 65th Medical Group), 14 June 1952 – 1 April 1953, 1 January 1982 – present

 Squadrons
 65th Civil Engineer Squadron, 14 August 2015 – present
 65th Comptroller Squadron (later 65th Comptroller Flight), 1 February 1996 – present
 65th Logistics Readiness Squadron, 14 August 2015 – present
 65th Security Forces Squadron, 14 August 2015 – present
 1605 Military Airlift Support Squadron (later 65 Military Airlift Support Squadron): 1 January 1982 – 1 October 1993
 1936th Communications Squadron (later 1605th Communications Squadron, 65th Communications Squadron), 1 September 1990 – 1 September 1997, 14 August 2015 – present
 496th Air Base Squadron, 1 April 2019 – present 

 Flights
 65th Comptroller Flight (see 65th Comptroller Squadron)
 65th Force Support Flight, 14 August 2015 – present

Stations
 Mitchel Air Force Base, New York, 14 June 1952 – 1 April 1953
 Lajes Field, Azores, 1 January 1982 – present

Aircraft
Curtiss C-46 Commando (1952–1953)

References

Notes

Bibliography

External links
Lajes Field Home Page

Terceira Island
0065